Inherent risk, in risk management, is an assessed level of raw or untreated risk; that is, the natural level of risk inherent in a process or activity without doing anything to reduce the likelihood or mitigate the severity of a mishap, or the amount of risk before the application of the risk reduction effects of controls. Another definition is that inherent risk is the current risk level given the existing set of controls, which may be incomplete or less than ideal, rather than an absence of any controls.

Inherent risk is contrasted with residual risk, which is the amount of risk left after treatment and added security measures.

See also

 Inherent risk (accounting), particularly, the consideration of the probability of material misstatements in financial records

References

Risk_management
Auditing terms